The 7th Syracuse Grand Prix was a motor race, run to Formula One rules, held on 7 April 1957 at Syracuse Circuit, Sicily. The race was run over 80 laps of the circuit, and was won by British driver Peter Collins in a Lancia-Ferrari D50, who also took pole position. Stirling Moss, driving a Vanwall, set fastest lap.

Results

References 

Syracuse Grand Prix
Syracuse Grand Prix
Syracuse Grand Prix
Syracuse Grand Prix